The Sibley Peninsula is a  long and  wide peninsula in Ontario, Canada, on Lake Superior. It projects into the lake from Superior's north shore, and separates Thunder Bay to the west from Black Bay to the east.

Sleeping Giant Provincial Park occupies most of the peninsula, while the actual Sleeping Giant rock formation, which resembles a human figure lying on its back, forms the southernmost extension of the peninsula. Twenty native fish species are known from lakes within the park.

Also on the peninsula are the Thunder Cape Bird Observatory, at its southern tip, and the small town of Silver Islet. Highway 587 runs along the peninsula from Highway 17 to Silver Islet.  
The peninsula was named after Alexander H. Sibley, president of the Silver Islet Mining Company that developed a mine there.

Geology
The peninsula can be separated into two physiographic areas—highlands and lowlands. With the exception of diabase dikes and the large diabase sill that forms the upper portion of the Sleeping Giant, the peninsula is underlain by sedimentary rocks, which strike northeast and slope towards the southwest, forming a cuesta.

History
Sibley Peninsula (pronounced Syb-Lee) has archaeological sites from Paleoindian, arachaic, and woodland settlements.
  In 1868 silver was discovered, and from 1870 to 1884 the mine at Silver Islet was the richest silver mine in the world.

See also

Black Bay Peninsula

References

External links
 Lake Superior magazine article that includes some history of the area
Photos of Thunder Bay including the Sleeping Giant Provincial Park and the Sibley Peninsula.
Ontario Parks Sleeping Giant Background Information (2003) Queen's Printer for Ontario. . Retrieved on 26 September 2007.

Peninsulas of Ontario
Landforms of Thunder Bay District